CONFIG.SYS is the primary configuration file for the DOS and OS/2 operating systems. It is a special ASCII text file that contains user-accessible setup or configuration directives evaluated by the operating system's DOS BIOS (typically residing in IBMBIO.COM or IO.SYS) during boot. CONFIG.SYS was introduced with DOS 2.0.

Usage 
The directives in this file configure DOS for use with devices and applications in the system. The CONFIG.SYS directives also set up the memory managers in the system. After processing the CONFIG.SYS file, DOS proceeds to load and execute the command shell specified in the SHELL line of CONFIG.SYS, or COMMAND.COM if there is no such line. The command shell in turn is responsible for processing the AUTOEXEC.BAT file.

CONFIG.SYS is composed mostly of name=value directives which look like variable assignments. In fact, these will either define some tunable parameters often resulting in reservation of memory, or load files, mostly device drivers and terminate-and-stay-resident programs (TSRs), into memory.

In DOS, CONFIG.SYS is located in the root directory of the drive from which the system was booted.

Some versions of DOS will probe for alternative filenames taking precedence over the default CONFIG.SYS filename if they exist:

While older versions of Concurrent DOS 3.2 to 4.1 did not support CONFIG.SYS files at all, later versions of Concurrent DOS 386 and Concurrent DOS XM, as well as Multiuser DOS, System Manager and REAL/32 will probe for CCONFIG.SYS (with "C" derived from "Concurrent") instead of CONFIG.SYS. Some versions of Multiuser DOS use a filename of CCONFIG.INI instead, whereas REAL/32 is known to look for MCONFIG.SYS. These operating systems support many additional and different configuration settings (like INIT_INSTALL) not known under MS-DOS/PC DOS, but they are stored in the binary repository named CCONFIG.BIN rather than in CCONFIG.INI. Both files are typically modified through a configuration utility named CONFIG.EXE only.

Under DR DOS 3.31, PalmDOS 1.0, Novell DOS 7, OpenDOS 7.01, and DR-DOS 7.02 and higher, a file named DCONFIG.SYS (with "D" derived from "DR DOS"), if present, will take precedence over CONFIG.SYS. Since DR DOS 6.0 this was used in conjunction with disk compression software, where the original boot drive C: would become drive D: after loading the compression driver (and the "D" in the file name came in handy as well), but it is commonly used to help maintain multiple configuration files in multi-boot scenarios.
In addition to this, OpenDOS 7.01 and DR-OpenDOS 7.02 will look for a file named ODCONFIG.SYS, whereas some issues of DR-DOS 7.02 and higher will instead also look for DRCONFIG.SYS.
Further, under DR DOS 6.0 and higher, the SYS /DR:ext command can be used to change the default file extensions. For example, with SYS /L /DR:703 the written Volume Boot Record would look for a renamed and modified IBMBIO.703 system file (instead of the default IBMBIO.COM) and the IBMBIO.703 would look for IBMDOS.703 and [D]CONFIG.703 (instead of IBMDOS.COM and [D]CONFIG.SYS), so that multiple parallel sets of files can coexist in the same root directory and be selected via a boot-loader like LOADER, supplied with Multiuser DOS and DR-DOS 7.02/7.03. The SHELL directive is enhanced to provide means to specify alternative AUTOEXEC.BAT files via /P[:filename.ext] and in this specific scenario, COMMAND.COM will accept file extensions other than ".BAT" as well (both features are also supported by 4DOS). Under DR DOS 6.0 and higher, the CONFIG.SYS directive CHAIN=filespec can be used to continue processing in the named file, which does not necessarily need to reside in the root directory of the boot drive. DR-DOS 7.02 and higher optionally support an additional parameter as in CHAIN=filespec,label to jump to a specific :label in the given file.
DR-DOS 7.03 and higher support a new SYS /A parameter in order to copy the corresponding CONFIG.SYS and AUTOEXEC.BAT files along with the system files.

FreeDOS implements a similar feature with its FDCONFIG.SYS configuration file. RxDOS 7.24 and higher use RXCONFIG.SYS instead. PTS-DOS uses CONFIG.PTS.

Both CONFIG.SYS and AUTOEXEC.BAT can be found included in the root folder of Windows 95, and Windows 98 boot drives, as they are based on DOS. Typically, these files are left empty, with no content.

Windows ME does not even parse the CONFIG.SYS file during the Windows boot process, loading environment variables from the Windows Registry instead:

 HKLM\System\CurrentControlSet\Control\SessionManager\Environment

Under FlexOS, CONFIG.SYS is a binary file defining the resource managers and device drivers loaded.

Directives

:;*?! 

See . (Under MS-DOS/PC DOS the inline-comment is not ignored if put in double-quotes.)
    Displays a Yes/No query and (since DR DOS 5.0) optional message to ask the user for confirmation to execute the following CONFIG.SYS directives. This variant is also supported by DR DOS.)
    Unconditionally execute the following CONFIG.SYS directive.

AC 
    Specifies if programs can be aborted on errors.
   Configures which drives should store file access date stamps in the reserved area of directory entries in FAT file systems.
    Conditional execution on AT-compatible machines only.
    Boot manager.
    Configures verbosity of error messages.
    Changes internal default serial device driver ( to ) for  device.
    Disables the availability of character devices outside phantom \DEV directory.
    Loads base device driver into memory.
    Emits a short beep, even if audible notifications are disabled via .
    Specifies operating system to be booted.
    Sets or clears extended  checking.
    Specifies the number of disk buffers to allocate.
    Maximum number of 512-byte cache blocks dynamically allocated from system pool.
    Maximum time in ms before unused cache blocks are returned to system pool.
    Maximum time in ms before a dirty cache block gets flushed to disk.
    Similar to  under DOS, loads programs in CONFIG.SYS. Similar to  under OS/2, but runs in foreground and halts CONFIG.SYS processing until return.
    Specifies whether the keyboard  status is turned on or off.
    Specifies the name of the CD-ROM hardware driver.
    Specifies the number of buffers for CD-ROM access.
    Continues CONFIG.SYS processing in new file and (since DR-DOS 7.02) at optional label.
    Specifies the type of clock used by the system.
    Clears screen.
    Specifies the OEM codepage(s).
    Specifies the address of the CMOS RAM.
    Specifies colors for boot menus.
    Defines count and logical order and configures I/O address and timeout for COM1: device.
    Defines count and logical order and configures I/O address and timeout for COM2: device.
    Defines count and logical order and configures I/O address and timeout for COM3: device.
    Defines count and logical order and configures I/O address and timeout for COM4: device.
    Specifies buffer for DMA.
    Redefines the lead-in character(s) for CONFIG.SYS inline-comments, or causes the following line to be ignored.
    Enables and configures international support.
    Sets display cursor to specified position for configuration menus.
   For codepage switching support.
    Specifies RAM refresh speed.
    Conditional execution on 8088 CPUs only.
    Conditional execution on 8088 and higher CPUs only.
    Conditional execution on 8086 CPUs only.
    Conditional execution on 8086/8088 and higher CPUs only.
    Conditional execution on 286 CPUs only.
    Conditional execution on 286 and higher CPUs only.
   Conditional execution on 386 and higher CPUs only, f.e.  or 
    Conditional execution on 386 and higher CPUs only.
    Conditional execution on 486 CPUs only.
    Conditional execution on 486 and higher CPUs only.

DF 
    Configures the relocation of the drive descriptor tables.
    Specifies the memory segment address up to which multi-sector disk data deblocking is allowed.
    Enables internal debugger support.
    Boot manager.
    Loads a device driver into memory.
    Loads a device driver into upper memory.
    Configures country and codepage information for KBD, SCR, LPT1, LPT2, LPT3 devices.
    Configures cache memory sizes.
    Specifies floppy disk compatibility mode.
    Specifies display font.
    Specifies whether to load DOS into the high memory area and/or use upper memory. (Similar to  under DRDOS 5.0.)
    Specifies whether to load DOS tables into upper memory.
    Specifies alternative path to search for DOS files.
  
    Specifies the search path for data files.
    Specifies physical parameters of disk drives.
    Define parameters for unrecognized drives.
    See .
    Enables and specifies drive for PDUMP.nnn error logs.
    Displays a message on screen.
    Displays a message including ANSI Escape sequences.
    Specifies if additional checks should be carried out when starting programs.
    Specifies an error / return code to be assumed in the following.
    Specifies the state of the A20 gate when starting a program.
   Specified the size of the hash table for fast file open operations. Works considerably differently from the external MS-DOS/PC DOS FASTOPEN driver.
    Specifies the number of cached FCBs that can be opened at once. (Under DR-DOS,  and  dynamically share the same internal buffer.)
    Boot manager.
    Specifies the number of files that can be opened at once.
    Include execution of specified CONFIG.SYS subsections. See .

GI 
    Waits for key (or timeout) and sets error level to its ASCII code (or 1024 on timeout).
    Continues CONFIG.SYS processing at specified label.
    Continues nested CONFIG.SYS processing at specified label, with  returning to old location.
    See .
    See .
    See .
    Installs a TSR program into memory, like , but installs after the DOS data segment relocation. Compare also: INSTCDEX.
    See .
    Enables and configures console and command line history buffer and extended pattern search functionality.
    Specifies the address of the HMA segment.
    Configures HLT energy saving.
    Specifies if the system should check for boot sector viruses.
    Loads installable file systems.
    Exclude execution of specified CONFIG.SYS subsections. See .
    Specifies programs (which would normally run at the CPU's IOPL ring 3) which should be allowed to run at ring 2 in order to directly access the hardware for I/O.
    Include directives from another menu block. (Can be emulated using  and  under DR-DOS.)
    Specifies whether the keyboard  mode status is turned on or off.
    Installs a TSR program into memory.
    Installs a TSR program into upper memory.
    Installs a TSR program into memory, like , but installs after the DOS data segment relocation. Compare also: INSTCDEX.
    Rotates PIC controller interrupt priorities so that specified number gets the highest priority

KM 
    Specifies the keyboard layout.
    Specifies the address of the relocated keyboard buffer.
    Specifies the maximum of drives that can be accessed.
    Same as LASTDRIVE, but explicitly loads the Current Directory Structure (CDS) into upper memory.
    Specifies a list of search paths for DLLs.
    Specifies how old programs should be handled.
    Specifies number of file locks.
    Configures boot logo support under MS-DOS. Allows to display startup message in conjunction with PTS-DOS boot manager.
    Defines count and logical order and configures I/O address and timeout for LPT1: device.
    Defines count and logical order and configures I/O address and timeout for LPT2: device.
    Defines count and logical order and configures I/O address and timeout for LPT3: device.
    Enables, defines count and logical order and configures I/O address and timeout for LPT4: device.
    Specifies time before a waiting process gets a higher priority.
    Configures memory allocation strategy
    Specifies the default DOS memory allocation strategy.
    Defines menu options.
    Specifies menu colors. (Can be emulated using  under DR-DOS.)
    Specifies the default menu block. (Can be emulated using  and  under DR-DOS.)
    Specifies a menu block. (Can be emulated using  and  under DR-DOS.)
    Specifies whether multitrack disk operations are used or not.
    Continues CONFIG.SYS processing in new file (similar to DR-DOS CHAIN) and optionally after loading a specific device driver and setting %NEWFILE% environment variable.

NQ 
    Specifies the default No character in Yes/No/Resume questions.)
    Specifies whether the keyboard  status is turned on or off.
    Specifies if user must acknowledge errors in CONFIG.SYS.
    Configures buffer size for LPT1, LPT2, LPT3.
    Conditional execution on PC-compatible machines only.
    Configures priority scheduler.
    Configures priority of programs using disk I/O.
    Specifies if DOS programs can be run or not.
    Loads user interface.
    Conditional execution on PS/1-compatible machines only.
    Conditional execution on PS/2-compatible machines only.
    Mutes display output send to STDOUT.

RT 
    Specifies if system should reboot automatically on errors.
    Allows comments in CONFIG.SYS.
    Specifies a drive letter not to be used up for local block device drivers.
   Specifies the default Resume character in Yes/No/Resume queries.)
An optional return code can be given, otherwise 0 is assumed.
    Defines the real mode memory size.
Similar to  under DOS and  under OS/2, but loads programs in background concurrently.
    Specifies, if the first character of deleted files should be stored in the reserved area of directory entries in the FAT file system.
    Similar to  under PTS-DOS, specifies the video mode to be used under FreeDOS. Under PTS-DOS,  does not specify the video mode but screen access methods.
    Specifies whether the keyboard  status is turned on or off.)
    Sets environment variables.
    Loads the command interpreter shell.
Can be useful to avoid HMA fragmentation in conjunction with third-party shells which cannot load into the HMA. SHELLHIGH under PTS-DOS tries to load the shell into UMBs instead.)
    Specifies the state of the keyboard modifiers like Shift Lock, Num Lock, Scroll Lock or Insert mode.
    Specifies if POST should be skipped on reboots.
    Compatibility dummy - DR DOS 3.31 - 6.0 were mostly reentrant and had a different stacks layout.
    Specifies the number of stacks for hardware interrupts.
    Default stack size allocated for new threads.
    Boot manager.
    Internal use.
    Specifies how XMS A20 gate control should work.
    Specifies a submenu block. (Can be emulated using ,  and  under DR-DOS.)
    Specifies a drive where to log error information instead of displaying a textmode popup screen.
    Specifies swap file path.
    Conditionally continues nested CONFIG.SYS processing at one of the specified labels depending on keys pressed, with  returning to old location.
   Defines the default SwitChar used by the system (either '/' or '-').
    Specifies special options.
    Specifies if a fix for a FPU rounding bug should be activated or not.
    Specifies file name of alternative DOS operating systems to boot.
    Configures the location of the various DOS parts in memory.
    Load system from alternative disk area.
    Size of system memory pool from which the system dynamically allocates for various purposes
    Specifies if DOS data and code should be loaded into UMBs.
    Specifies number of concurrent threads.
PTS-DOS only supports the timeout value.
    Configures minimum and maximum time slices for scheduler.
    Specifies the file extension for temporary files.
    Globally or locally enables or disables CONFIG.SYS (and AUTOEXEC.BAT) single-stepping execution. The functionality under OS/2 differs significantly from that under DOS.
    Specifies size of  log buffer.
    Logs detailed error information.

UZ 
    Configures DOS management to use a specific segment as UMB memory.
    Configures the UMB server used.
    Specifies the address ranges used as UMB RAM.
    Enables or disables disk write verification.
    Specifies the DOS version (and optionally the true DOS version) to be reported to programs.
    Configures VGA display status.
    Similar to  under FreeDOS, specifies current video mode.
    Specifies if virtual DMA can be used.
    Specifies if the processor's Virtual Mode Extensions (VME) should be deactivated or not.
    Configures VxD driver for Windows.
    Configures system support for Windows.
    Configures the relocation of the Extended BIOS data area (XBDA)
    Conditional execution on XT-compatible machines only.
    Configures the built-in Year 2000 support.
    Specifies the default Yes character in Yes/No/Resume queries.
    Configures deletion tracking.

Issues 
 
The system can still boot if this file is missing or corrupted. However, this file, along with AUTOEXEC.BAT, is essential for the complete bootup process to occur with the DOS operating system. These files contain information that is used to customize the operating system for personal use. They also contain the requirements of different software application packages. A DOS system would require troubleshooting if either of these files became damaged or corrupted.

If CONFIG.SYS does not contain a SHELL directive (or the file is corrupt or missing), DOS typically searches for COMMAND.COM in the root directory of the boot drive. If this is not found, versions of DOS before 6.0 will not start up. MS-DOS 6.0/PC DOS 6.1 and Novell DOS 7 and higher will instead display a prompt to enter the path and filename of a command processor. This recovery prompt is also displayed when the primary command processor is aborted due to faults or if it is exited deliberately. (In the case of COMMAND.COM, the internal EXIT command is disabled only when the shell was started with /P.) This also provides limited means to replace the shell at runtime without having to reboot the system.
Since the MS-DOS 7.0 and higher COMMAND.COM executable is incompatible with DR-DOS, but typically resides in the root of drive C: in dual-boot scenarios with DR-DOS, DR-DOS 7.02 and higher no longer allow to bypass SHELL directives in (+)// "skip"/"trace"/"step" modes. (Some later issues added (+) to reinvoke the former  "skip" behaviour in order to allow recovery from problems with invalid SHELL arguments as well.) Also, if no SHELL directive could be found when skipping CONFIG.SYS processing via (+) (and also with (+)/, when the default file extension has been changed with SYS /DR:ext), the user is prompted to enter a valid shell file name before trying to load COMMAND.COM from the root. Pressing  without specifying a file will assume the former default.

Depending on the version, the size of the CONFIG.SYS file is limited to a few kilobytes under MS-DOS/PC DOS (up to 64 KB in most recent versions), whereas the file's size is unlimited under DR-DOS. This is because the former operating systems (since DOS 3.0) will compile the file into some tokenized in-memory representation before they sort and regroup the directives to be processed in a specific order (with device drivers always being loaded before TSRs), whereas DR-DOS interprets the file and executes most directives line-by-line, thereby giving full control over the load order of drivers and TSRs via DEVICE and INSTALL (for example to solve load order conflicts or to load a program debugger before a device driver to be debugged) and allowing to adapt the user interaction and change the flow through the file based on conditions like processor types installed, any type of keys pressed, load or input errors occurring, or return codes given by loaded software. This becomes particularly useful since INSTALL can also be used to run non-resident software under DR-DOS, so that temporary external programs can be integrated into the CONFIG.SYS control flow.

In MS-DOS/PC DOS 2.0 through 4.01, the length of the SHELL line was limited to 31 characters, whereas up to 128 characters are possible in later versions. DR-DOS even accepts up to 255 characters. CONFIG.SYS directives do not accept long filenames.

Dual booting DOS and Windows 9x 
When installing Windows 95 over a preexisting DOS/Windows install, CONFIG.SYS and AUTOEXEC.BAT are renamed to CONFIG.DOS and AUTOEXEC.DOS. This is intended to ease dual booting between Windows 9x and DOS. When booting into DOS, they are temporarily renamed CONFIG.SYS and AUTOEXEC.BAT. Backups of the Windows 95 versions are made as CONFIG.W40 and AUTOEXEC.W40 files.

When Caldera DR-DOS 7.02/7.03 is installed on a system already containing Windows 95, Windows' CONFIG.SYS and AUTOEXEC.BAT retain those names. DR-DOS' startup files are installed as DCONFIG.SYS (a name already used in earlier versions of DR DOS) and AUTODOS7.BAT.

OS/2 / Windows NT 
OS/2 uses the CONFIG.SYS file extensively for setting up its configuration, drivers and environment before the graphical part of the system loads.

In the OS/2 subsystem of Windows NT, what appeared as CONFIG.SYS to OS/2 programs was actually stored in the registry.

There are many undocumented or poorly documented CONFIG.SYS directives used by OS/2.

CONFIG.SYS continues to be used by the OS/2 derivatives eComStation and ArcaOS.

See also 
 IBMBIO.COM / IO.SYS
 IBMDOS.COM / MSDOS.SYS
 CONFIG (environment variable)
 AUTOEXEC.BAT
 COMMAND.COM
 List of DOS commands

Notes

References

External links 
 
 
  (Description of DR-DOS 7 CONFIG.SYS directives (incomplete))
 
 
 

DOS configuration files
OS/2 files
Configuration files